AubieSat-1 (OSCAR-71) is a CubeSat designed, built, and tested by undergraduate students at Auburn University. It was launched from Vandenberg Air Force Base October 28, 2011 atop a Delta II rocket. This was a multi-payload mission with five other CubeSats, M-Cubed, DICE-1, DICE-2, Explorer-1 and RAX-2.

Purpose
The purpose of AubieSat-1 was to accomplish several things:
 Establish Auburn University as a university capable of developing satellites.
 Provide workforce applicable experience for students.
 Study and compare the effects of solar cell coatings.
 Demonstrate a system bus that could be used at the baseline design for additional satellites later developed by the program.

References

External links

 AubieSat-1 Website

CubeSats
Spacecraft launched in 2011